Randall Bone (born 13 November 1973) is a former Australian rules footballer in the Australian Football League.

Recruited from South Australian National Football League club South Adelaide, Bone made his AFL debut for Adelaide in 1992, playing 12 games and kicking 13 goals.  He then moved to Hawthorn in 1995, where he played 16 games and kicked 4 goals in four seasons.

References

External links
 
 

Hawthorn Football Club players
Adelaide Football Club players
South Adelaide Football Club players
Australian rules footballers from South Australia
1973 births
Living people
Southern Football League (South Australia) players